The 1914 South Carolina Gamecocks football team represented the University of South Carolina as an independent during the 1914 college football season. Led by third-year Norman B. Edgerton, the Gamecocks compiled a record of 5–5–1.

Schedule

References

South Carolina
South Carolina Gamecocks football seasons
South Carolina Gamecocks football